Braemore is a location in Berriedale in the Highland council area of Scotland. It can be approached from the A9 road at Dunbeath.

References

Populated places in Caithness